The 1966 Connecticut gubernatorial election was held on November 8, 1966. Incumbent Democrat John N. Dempsey defeated Republican nominee E. Clayton Gengras with 55.68% of the vote.

This was the first gubernatorial election since the state constitution was amended in 1962 to have both the Governor and Lieutenant Governor run on the same ticket in the general election.

General election

Candidates
John N. Dempsey, Democratic
E. Clayton Gengras, Republican

Results

References

1966
Connecticut
Gubernatorial